Andigola is a village in the municipality Čazma, Bjelovar-Bilogora County in Croatia. According to the 2001 census, there are 14 inhabitants.

References

Populated places in Bjelovar-Bilogora County